Willem "Wim" Drees Jr. (24 December 1922 – 5 September 1998) was a Dutch politician of the Democratic Socialists '70 (DS'70) party and economist.

Drees worked as a civil servant for the Ministry of Colonial Affairs in Batavia in the Dutch East Indies from 1945 until 1947 and as a financial analyst at the International Monetary Fund (IMF) from 1947 until 1950. Drees worked as Deputy Director of the Bureau for Economic Policy Analysis from 1 January 1950 until 1 January 1956 and as a civil servant for the Ministry of Finance as Director-General of the department for Budgetary Affairs from 1 January 1956 until 1 September 1969. In August 1969 Drees was appointed as Treasurer-General of the Ministry of Finance, serving from 1 September 1969 until 8 January 1971. In December 1970 Drees was approached by the Chairman of the newly founded Democratic Socialists '70 Jan van Stuijvenberg to seek the leadership for the election of 1971. Drees accepted and was unopposed in his candidacy and was elected as Leader and became the Lijsttrekker (top candidate) of the Democratic Socialists '70 for the election on 8 January 1971, he resigned as Treasurer-General that same day. After the election the Democratic Socialists '70 entered the House of Representatives with 8 seats. Drees was elected as a Member of the House of Representatives and became the Parliamentary leader of the Democratic Socialists '70 in the House of Representatives, taking office on 11 May 1971. Following the cabinet formation of 1971 Drees was appointed as Minister of Transport and Water Management in the Cabinet Biesheuvel I, taking office on 6 July 1971. The Cabinet Biesheuvel I fell just one year later on 19 July 1972 after the Democratic Socialists '70 (DS'70) retracted their support following their dissatisfaction with the proposed budget memorandum to further reduce the deficit. The Democratic Socialists '70 cabinet members resigned on 21 July 1972. For the election of 1972 Drees again served as Lijsttrekker. The Democratic Socialists '70 suffered a small loss, losing 2 seats and now had 6 seats in the House of Representatives. Drees returned as a Member of the House of Representatives and Parliamentary leader in the House of Representatives, taking office on 5 September 1972. For the election of 1977 Drees once more served as Lijsttrekker. The Democratic Socialists '70 suffered a big loss, losing 5 seats and now had only 1 seat in the House of Representatives. Drees took responsibility for the defeat and sequentially announced he was stepping down as Leader and Parliamentary leader and a Member of the House of Representative on 20 August 1977.

Drees semi-retired from active politics and became active in the public sector, in September 1977 Drees was nominated as a Member of the Court of Audit, serving from 4 October 1977 until 1 January 1984. After his retirement, Drees occupied numerous seats as a nonprofit director in the public sector (International Institute of Social History, Society for Statistics and Operations Research, Transnational Institute, Stichting Pensioenfonds ABP, European Cultural Foundation and the International Statistical Institute)

Biography

Education
After attending Gymnasium Haganum from 1934 to 1940, Drees studied at the Erasmus University Rotterdam from 1940 to 1946, and gained his doctorate there in 1955.

Political career
Son of former Prime Minister of the Netherlands Willem Drees, he was a member of the Labour Party from 1946 until 1970 when he entered politics as Party leader of the new Democratic Socialists '70, a relatively right-wing split from the Labour Party. He served as Parliamentary leader of the Democratic Socialists '70 in the House of Representatives from 29 April 1971 and a Member of the House of Representatives from 11 May 1971. After the Dutch general election of 1971 and became Minister of Transport and Water Management in the Cabinet Biesheuvel I serving from 6 July 1971 until 21 July 1972. He returned to the House of Representatives on 5 September 1972 and again became Parliamentary leader in the House of Representatives on 14 May 1973. He resigned his positions on 20 August 1977 and retired as Leader of the Democratic Socialists '70 the same day.

Family
On 3 February 1947, he married Anna Erica Gescher (born 26 October 1922). They had five children; four girls and one son Willem B. Drees, their third child, became a philosopher. Anna Erica Drees-Gescher died on 12 May 1988 at the age of 65. Willem Drees Jr. died on 5 September 1998 at the age of 75. Relatively young compared to his parents; his father Willem Drees died at the age of 101 and his mother Catharina Hent died at the age of 85.

Decorations

References

External links

Official
  Dr. W. (Wim) Drees jr. Parlement & Politiek

 

1922 births
1998 deaths
Commanders of the Order of Orange-Nassau
Democratic Socialists '70 politicians
Dutch accountants
Dutch agnostics
Dutch expatriates in Indonesia
Dutch expatriates in the United States
Dutch financial analysts
Dutch financial writers
Dutch humanists
Dutch nonprofit directors
Dutch nonprofit executives
Dutch officials of the United Nations
Erasmus University Rotterdam alumni
Academic staff of Erasmus University Rotterdam
International Monetary Fund people
Knights of the Order of the Netherlands Lion
Leaders of the Democratic Socialists '70
Macroeconomists
Members of the Court of Audit (Netherlands)
Members of the House of Representatives (Netherlands)
Members of the Royal Netherlands Academy of Arts and Sciences
Monetarists
Monetary economists
Ministers of Transport and Water Management of the Netherlands
Municipal councillors of The Hague
Public economists
Writers from The Hague
20th-century Dutch civil servants
20th-century Dutch economists
20th-century Dutch educators
20th-century Dutch male writers
20th-century Dutch mathematicians
20th-century Dutch politicians
Treasurers-General